Achai Wiir is a South Sudanese philanthropist and businesswoman Achai is also the founder of the Achai Wiir Foundation, a non-profit working in supporting vulnerable people in South Sudan

Early life

Contribution 
Achai Wiir has helped in distributing food and non-food items to the needy including hundreds of orphans in South Sudan. She has also assisted in bailing out inmates in prisons across the country, with minor crimes and those unable to pay their own bail

Achai Wiir who also gifted Ugandan renowned Singer Jose Chameleon with a brand new Toyota V8 in 2020 She is also seen as a symbol of unity among South Sudan, particularly those living in Uganda

Controversies 
In September 2022, Ugandan Police accused Achai Wiir of Child Trafficking after authorities seized about 8 babies from her apartment in Buziga Suburb of Kampala City

However, Achai Wiir refuted all claims linking her to the child trafficking, adding that the kids were children from her hometown of Abyei whose parents were killed or displaced by insurgence in the area

On November 11, police in Juba City of South Sudan also issued an arrest warrant to the businesswoman over alleged threats against her sister

It was alleged that one of Achai Wiir's sisters filed the initial report with police, citing that Achai Wiir's actions were spoiling the family's name

References 

Businesswomen
Philanthropists